Sa Re Ga Ma Pa Keralam is an Indian Malayalam language musical reality TV show which launched on 6 April 2019 on Zee Keralam channel.  The show is produced by Essel Vision Productions. The show is the Malayalam language version of Sa Re Ga Ma Pa, the oldest running singing reality show in India.

The current version of Sa Re Ga Ma Pa Keralam is Sa Re Ga Ma Pa L'il Champs, for kids aged 5 to 14.

Overview 
The show has two variations over the years:
 Sa Re Ga Ma Pa: Contestants were scored only by the expert judges. There were 8 prelim (quarter-final) rounds, each consisting of 2 male singers and 2 female singers. One male winner and one female winner from each show competed in the semifinal rounds. There were 4 semifinal rounds where the 8 male and 8 female prelim winners participated. Each semifinal round had either 4 male or 4 female winners, so there were a total of 4 semifinals (2 semifinals with 4 males and 2 semifinals with 4 female singers). In the finals, the four semifinal winners, 2 male and 2 female competed against each other. Finally one male winner and one female winner became the winners of that season (also called a schedule).
 Sa Re Ga Ma Pa L'il Champs: A singing competition for young children, which judges the prodigious kids on the basis of their voice quality, singing talent and versatility in performance.

Seasons

References

External links
 Sa Re Ga Ma Pa Keralam at ZEE5

Indian reality television series
2019 Indian television seasons
Sa Re Ga Ma Pa
Zee Keralam original programming
Malayalam-language television shows